Damsel is a synonym for mademoiselle.

Damsel may also refer to:

 Damsel in distress a female stock character
 Unmarried lady-in-waiting
 Damsel, Missouri
 Damsel (2015 film)
 Damsel (2018 film)
 Damsel (upcoming film)
 Damsel, a nickname for Santos-Dumont Demoiselle aircraft

See also 
 Damsel in Distress (disambiguation)
 Demoiselle (disambiguation)
 Damsel bug
 Damselfish
 Damselfly